The Mackerras pendulum was devised by the Australian psephologist Malcolm Mackerras as a way of predicting the outcome of an election contested between two major parties in a Westminster style lower house legislature such as the Australian House of Representatives, which is composed of single-member electorates and which uses a preferential voting system such as a Condorcet method or instant-runoff voting.

The pendulum works by lining up all of the seats held in Parliament for the government, the opposition and the crossbenches according to the percentage point margin they are held by on a two party preferred basis. This is also known as the swing required for the seat to change hands. Given a uniform swing to the opposition or government parties, the number of seats that change hands can be predicted.

Classification of seats as marginal, fairly safe or safe is applied by the independent Victorian Electoral Commission using the following definition: "Where a winning party receives less than 56% of the vote, the seat is classified as 'marginal', 56–60% is classified as 'fairly safe' and more than 60% is considered 'safe'." Here, 'the vote' is defined as the vote after preferences, where the distribution of preferences has continued to the point where there are only 2 candidates left.

Pendulum

Results updated as of 12pm AEDT on 10 December. Election deferred in Liberal-held Narracan, where a supplementary election will be held due to the death of a candidate on 21 November.

References

Pendulums for Victorian state elections